Jane Loretta Anne Goldman (born 11 June 1970) is an English screenwriter, author and producer. With Matthew Vaughn, she co-wrote the screenplays of Kingsman: The Secret Service (2014) and its sequel Kingsman: The Golden Circle (2017), as well as X-Men: First Class (2011), Kick-Ass (2010) and Stardust (2007). Goldman also worked on the story of X-Men: Days of Future Past (2014), the sequel to First Class, in partnership with Vaughn. Both met high critical praise for their partnership works.

Goldman's first solo screenplay was The Woman in Black (2012). She also wrote the script for Miss Peregrine's Home for Peculiar Children, a 2016 film adaption of the novel, for Tim Burton.

She has also written the books Dreamworld (2000) and The X-Files Book of the Unexplained (1997), and presented her own TV series on the paranormal, Jane Goldman Investigates, on the channel Living, in 2003 and 2004.

Early life
Goldman was raised in a liberal, middle-class family in north London, the only child of a Jewish father and a Buddhist mother. She attended the King Alfred School, an independent school in Hampstead, until the age of 15 before moving to the United States to follow Boy George on tour. Upon her return to the UK, she took a job as an entertainment reporter with the Daily Star. When she was 16, she met TV presenter Jonathan Ross. They married in 1988, when Goldman was 18 years old. The couple have three children: two daughters and a son.

Professional career

Journalism, books and TV
As a journalist, Goldman worked on newspapers and magazines such as Just Seventeen, Cosmopolitan, The Times, Evening Standard, Zero, Daily Star, Total Guitar, Game Zone and Sega Zone. At the age of 19, she became a freelance writer.

Goldman also wrote books: Thirteen-Something (1993), Streetsmarts: A Teenager's Safety Guide (1996), Sussed and Streetwise (1997), the two-volume best-selling series The X-Files Book of the Unexplained (1997), her first and only novel Dreamworld (2000), and Do the Right Thing (2007).

Between 2003 and 2004 she had her own television series. Jane Goldman Investigates researched the paranormal and was transmitted by channel Living between 2003 and 2004. Goldman is also in the production teams of a number of TV shows, such as The Big Fat Quiz of the Year.

Screenwriting and partnership with Matthew Vaughn
She made the jump to screenwriting, and was part of the writing team for David Baddiel's short-lived sitcom Baddiel's Syndrome, in 2001. Later, she co-wrote the screenplay of Stardust (2007), based on the novel of the same name by Neil Gaiman and directed by Matthew Vaughn. Gaiman introduced Goldman to Vaughn to provide the director some help with the adaptation process. The film received many accolades and gave the screenwriters a Hugo Award for Best Dramatic Presentation, Long Form.

After Stardust, Goldman became a frequent collaborator with director Matthew Vaughn, co-writing his next films, the comic-book adaptations Kick-Ass (2010) and X-Men: First Class (2011). Both films won strong praise amongst film critics. Kick-Ass enjoys a cult following and X-Men: First Class is considered by many critics to be one of the best of all X-Men films. Rotten Tomatoes consensus says: "With a strong script, stylish direction, and powerful performances from its well-rounded cast, X-Men: First Class is a welcome return to form for the franchise."

She continued to work in adaptations, and was also a co-writer with Vaughn and Peter Straughan for the 2011 drama-thriller The Debt, which was based on the 2007 Israeli film HaHov and directed by John Madden. Goldman also adapted for Hammer The Woman in Black, based on Susan Hill's horror novel. This film was directed by James Watkins and it is the first solo screenplay by Goldman. It was released in 2012 and met positive reviews. In March 2013, The Woman in Black won the Empire Award for Best Horror.

She is credited on X-Men: Days of Future Past, the sequel to First Class, as writing the story with Matthew Vaughn and Simon Kinberg.

With Vaughn, Goldman co-wrote the script for Kingsman: The Secret Service (2015), based on the comic book by Mark Millar and Dave Gibbons. She wrote the script for Miss Peregrine's Home for Peculiar Children, an adaptation of the Ransom Riggs novel of the same name, which was directed by Tim Burton.

Goldman co-wrote the 2020 adaptation of Daphne du Maurier's Gothic romance Rebecca, directed by Ben Wheatley.

Upcoming projects
Goldman is attached to various upcoming projects, including Nonplayer, an adaptation of the sci-fi comic book by Nate Simpson for Warner Bros.; and a rewrite of the Pinocchio screenplay originally written by Bryan Fuller,  She is also involved in adaptation of Anubis, based on a science-fiction/comedy short story by Paul Murray. On 6 December 2017, it was announced Goldman would write a screenplay for Disney's live-action adaptation of The Little Mermaid with Rob Marshall being eyed to direct. The film will be released on May 26, 2023.

In May 2017, HBO announced Goldman was one of four writers working on a potential pilot for a Game of Thrones spin-off. In addition to Goldman, Carly Wray, Max Borenstein, and Brian Helgeland were also working on potential pilots. Goldman has been working and communicating with George R. R. Martin, the author of A Song of Ice and Fire, the series of novels upon which the original series is based. Game of Thrones showrunners D. B. Weiss and David Benioff would also be executive producers for whichever project is picked up by HBO. In June 2018, it was confirmed that Goldman's pilot had been greenlit by HBO, and would focus on "the world's descent from the golden Age of Heroes into its darkest hour", thousands of years before the events of Game of Thrones. In late October 2019, it was announced that HBO would not be moving forward with the pilot.

In popular culture
Alongside her husband, broadcaster Jonathan Ross, Goldman appeared as a character in Neil Gaiman's short story The Facts in the Case of the Departure of Miss Finch in 1996. Gaiman is a personal friend of the couple.

Filmography
Writing credits

Television

Bibliography

References

External links

 
 

1970 births
Living people
21st-century British screenwriters
21st-century English women writers
British television producers
British women screenwriters
British women television producers
English female models
English people of Jewish descent
English screenwriters
English television presenters
English television producers
English women journalists
English women non-fiction writers
English women novelists
English writers on paranormal topics
Hugo Award-winning writers
People from Hammersmith
Ross family
Women science fiction and fantasy writers